The First Secretary of the Adjar regional branch of the Communist Party of the Soviet Union was the position of highest authority in the Adjar ASSR in the Georgian SSR of the Soviet Union. The position was created in 1921, and abolished in 1991. The First Secretary was a de facto appointed position usually by the Politburo or the General Secretary himself.

List of First Secretaries of the Communist Party of Adjaria

See also
Adjar Autonomous Soviet Socialist Republic

Notes

Sources
 World Statesmen.org

Regional Committees of the Communist Party of Georgia (Soviet Union)
Politics of Adjara
1921 establishments in Russia
1991 disestablishments in the Soviet Union